Heteroperipatus engelhardi is a species of velvet worm in the Peripatidae family. Males of this species have 27 or 28 pairs of legs; females have 31 or 32 leg pairs. Females range from 24.5 mm to 52 mm in length; males range from 12 mm to 25 mm in length. The type locality is in El Salvador.

References

Onychophoran species
Onychophorans of tropical America
Animals described in 1954